Freyeria putli, the eastern grass jewel or small grass jewel, or oriental grass jewel is a small butterfly found in Ceylon, Myanmar, India and Australia that belongs to the lycaenids or blues family.

Description

Frederic Moore (1880) gives a detailed description:

See also
 List of butterflies of India
 List of butterflies of India (Lycaenidae)

References

External links

Butterflies of Africa
Butterflies of Europe
Butterflies of Asia
Polyommatini
Butterflies described in 1845